Kim Ji-woong may refer to:
 Kim Ji-woong (footballer)
 Kim Ji-woong (entertainer)